Kathy O' is a 1958 American CinemaScope comedy-drama film directed by Jack Sher and starring Dan Duryea, Jan Sterling, Patty McCormack and Mary Fickett.

Plot
Kathy O'Rourke is a child actress who portrays girls such as Shirley Temple on the screen. However, in real life, Kathy is a self-centered brat. Publicity agent Harry Johnson is tasked by the studio with the job of keeping national magazine reporter Celeste Saunders, his ex-wife, from discovering that their child star is a devil and not an angel. Celeste and Kathy become great friends because Celeste treats Kathy as a normal child and not as a star. When Kathy runs away to be with Celeste, Harry is accused of kidnapping her.

Cast
 Dan Duryea as Harry Johnson
 Jan Sterling as Celeste Saunders
 Patty McCormack as Kathy O'Rourke
 Mary Fickett as Helen Johnson
 Sam Levene as Ben Melnick
 Mary Jane Croft as Harriet Burton
 Rickey Kelman as Robert 'Bo' Johnson
 Terry Kelman as Tommy Johnson
 Ainslie Pryor as Lieut. Chavez
 Barney Phillips as Matt Williams
 Mel Leonard as Sid 
 Casey Walters as Billy Blair
 Walter Woolf King as Donald C. Faber
 Alexander Campbell as Bixby
 Joseph Sargent as Mike
 Mary Carver as Marge

See also
 List of American films of 1958

References

External links
 
 
 

Films scored by Frank Skinner
Films directed by Jack Sher
Films with screenplays by Jack Sher
1958 comedy films
Universal Pictures films
1950s English-language films